Danny Burstein (born June 16, 1964) is an American actor and singer. Known for his work on the Broadway stage he's received a numerous accolades including a Tony Award, two Drama Desk Awards and nominations for three Grammy Awards.

A seven-time Tony Award nominee, Burstein won the 2020 Tony Award for Best Featured Actor in a Musical for his performance as Harold Zidler in Moulin Rouge! on Broadway. His Tony-nominated roles were in The Drowsy Chaperone (2006), South Pacific (2008), Follies (2011), Golden Boy (2013), Cabaret (2014), and Fiddler on the Roof (2016). Other notable Broadway credits include The Seagull (1992), Saint Joan (1993), and Women on the Verge of a Nervous Breakdown (2010), and Pictures From Home (2023).

Burstein's television work includes a feature-length episode of the BBC sitcom Absolutely Fabulous (2002) and a Staten Island father in the first season of Louie (2010). He appeared as different characters in six episodes of the original NBC drama series Law & Order (1995–2010), and also recurred as Lolly Steinman on the HBO series Boardwalk Empire (2010–11) and as D.A. Lewis Cormier on the CBS series Evil. His film appearances include Transamerica (2005), Deception (2008), The Family Fang (2015), and Indignation (2016).

Early life and education
Burstein was born in Mt. Kisco, New York, and was raised in New York City. Danny's parents separated when he was two months old. He was raised by his mother, Virginia (Vega), a painter, and his stepfather, Harvey Burstein, a professor of Greek philosophy. His mother, who is from Costa Rica, is Catholic and of Spanish descent, and his stepfather is Jewish. He was not raised in any particular faith and celebrated both Jewish and Christian holidays.

Burstein attended the High School of the Performing Arts.  While in high school, he performed in community theatre and summer stock in New Hampshire for which he was paid $200 for the entire season.  He graduated from Queens College in New York City, during which time he obtained his first professional acting job in the chorus of The Music Man at The Muny in St. Louis. He received an MFA from the graduate acting program at the University of California, San Diego in 1990.  During his time in drama school at UCSD, he appeared in Macbeth at La Jolla Playhouse.

Career
On Broadway, Burstein's eighteen appearances, which have garnered him seven Tony Award nominations, have included A Little Hotel on the Side (1992), Yakov in The Seagull (1992–93), in Saint Joan and Three Men on a Horse (both in 1993), Paul in Company (1995), 1st Officer William Murdoch in Titanic (1997–99), Aldolpho in The Drowsy Chaperone (2006–07), Luther Billis in South Pacific (2008–10), Taxi Driver in Women on the Verge of a Nervous Breakdown (2010–11), Tokio in Golden Boy (2012–2013), Max in the Sharr White play The Snow Geese (2013), Herr Schultz in the 2014 revival of Cabaret (2014–15) and Tevye in Fiddler on the Roof (2015–2016).

Burstein's Off-Broadway credits include Rajiv Joseph's Describe the Night at the Atlantic Theater Company; Talley's Folly opposite Sarah Paulson at The Roundabout Theater Company for which he was nominated for a Lucille Lortel Award and a Drama League Award; the world premieres of A. R. Gurney's Mrs. Farnsworth (2004), opposite Sigourney Weaver and John Lithgow, at The Flea Theater and Psych (2001) at Playwrights Horizons. He also starred in I Love You, You're Perfect, Now Change (1996 and 2002) at the Westside Theatre; as Ru/Floor Monitor/Pianist in Merrily We Roll Along (1994) at the York Theatre at St. Peter's Church; All in the Timing at the Houseman; as Daniel in Alan Menken and David Spencer's Weird Romance at the WPA; as Solomon in The Rothschilds and Hello Muddah, Hello Fadduh, both at Circle in the Square; The United Way at Ensemble Studio Theater; and A Class Act at Manhattan Theatre Club. He appeared in four concerts at Carnegie Hall including: the Ira Gershwin centennial, as Steward in Sail Away (1999), and in Candide (2018). He appeared in the Encores! (New York City Center) staged concert productions of DuBarry Was a Lady (1996), as Romeo Skragg in Li'l Abner (1998), as Tailor-Merchant in The Boys from Syracuse (1997) and as Mister Mister in The Cradle Will Rock (2013).

He played the role of Buddy Plummer in the Kennedy Center production of Follies, which ran from May 7, 2011, through June 19, 2011, at the Eisenhower Theater, co-starring with Bernadette Peters, Ron Raines, and Jan Maxwell.  He reprised that role in the Broadway engagement of Follies at the Marquis Theatre from August 7, 2011 (in previews) through January 22, 2012, and continued with the production in its engagement at the Ahmanson Theatre in Los Angeles, California from May 3, 2012, through June 9, 2012. He won the Drama Desk Award and Outer Critics Circle Award for Outstanding Actor in a Musical and was nominated for the Tony Award, Best Actor in a Musical.

Burstein can be heard on the cast recording of many of these musicals. Among his many recordings is the musical Sweet Little Devil in which he introduced three George Gershwin, Buddy DeSylva songs. The score originally went unrecorded in 1924 and was finally recorded by PS Classics, with Burstein playing the role of Sam in 2012.

Burstein's film roles include Duane Incarnate (2004), Transamerica (2005), Deception (2008), Nor'easter (2013), Trust, Greed, Bullets and Bourbon (2013), American Milkshake (2013), Autumn Whispers (2013), Affluenza (2014), Blackhat (2015), directed by Michael Mann, The Family Fang (2015), opposite Nicole Kidman and directed by Jason Bateman, Construction (2015), Indignation (2016), written and directed by James Schamus, and The Sounding, written & directed by Catherine Eaton. His many television credits include recurring on The Good Fight, recurring on Dr. Death, recurring as D.A. Lewis Cormier on Evil, guest starring on the animated series Central Park as Dick Flake, and guest starring on Tales of the City (2019), Fosse/Verdon (2019), The Blacklist (2019), Madam Secretary (2018), NCIS: New Orleans (2018), Instinct (2018), Elementary (2017), all the Law & Order series, the BBC's Absolutely Fabulous (2002), the FX series Louie (2010), and The Good Wife (2015). He was cast in HBO's Boardwalk Empire after director Martin Scorsese saw him in South Pacific, and after auditioning for three different characters, he landed the part of Lolly Steinman.

Burstein has lent his voice in a number of video games, including Grand Theft Auto: San Andreas, Manhunt 2, Grand Theft Auto IV, and Neverwinter Nights 2.

He made his Metropolitan Opera debut as Frosch in Die Fledermaus (2013–14 season).

Burstein serves on the Artists Committee of the Kennedy Center Honors and has been a guest lecturer teaching at many universities such as Yale, NYU, Juilliard, UCSD and Queens College.

Burstein played the role of Tevye in the 2015 Broadway revival of Fiddler on the Roof, at the Broadway Theatre, directed by Bartlett Sher. The revival began in previews on November 20, 2015, and officially opened on December 20, 2015, and closed on December 31, 2016.

In the summer of 2017, he played the role of Nick Bottom in the New York Public Theater's Shakespeare in the Park production of A Midsummer Night's Dream.

He appeared as Alfred P. Doolittle in the Broadway revival of My Fair Lady at Lincoln Center Theater from January 8, 2019. He also originated the on-stage role of Harold Zidler on Broadway in Moulin Rouge! in 2019. Moulin Rouge! played its pre-Broadway performances at the Emerson Colonial Theatre in Boston from July 10, 2018, to August 19, 2018. In 2021, Burstein received the Tony Award for Best Featured Actor in a Musical for Moulin Rouge!

In 2021 he was nominated for an Audie Award for his narration of Stephen King's If It Bleeds.

Burstein returned to the Broadway stage in the 2023 Sharr White memory play Pictures From Home alongside Nathan Lane and Zoë Wanamaker. The play is adapted from photographer Larry Sultan's photo memoir of the same name.

Personal life
Burstein was married to actress Rebecca Luker from June 2000 until her death on December 23, 2020. He has two sons, Alexander and Zachary, from a previous marriage, and lives in Morningside Heights, Manhattan.

In March 2020, following the shutdown of all Broadway theatrical productions including Moulin Rouge!, in which he was starring, Burstein, along with several other cast members, contracted COVID-19. He was subsequently hospitalized at St. Luke's in the Morningside Heights section of Manhattan and recovered. Burstein discussed his experience with the disease in a column published in The Hollywood Reporter. He wrote in August 2020 of continued challenges with his post-COVID recovery while caring for his wife, who had ALS.

Filmography

Film

Television

Theatre

Video games

Awards and nominations

References

External links

Panarello, Joseph F. "Behind the Stage Door with Danny Burstein", July 6, 2006 (Broadway World.com)

1964 births
American male film actors
American male singers
American male musical theatre actors
American male stage actors
American male television actors
American male voice actors
Audiobook narrators
Drama Desk Award winners
Living people
People from Mount Kisco, New York
Male actors from New York City
Fiorello H. LaGuardia High School alumni
Queens College, City University of New York alumni
University of California, San Diego alumni
20th-century American male actors
21st-century American male actors
American people of Costa Rican descent
American people of Spanish descent
Tony Award winners